Juliya Chernetsky Denning (Yulia Chernetska; born July 10, 1982), is a television personality best known for her stage name Mistress Juliya and the popularity on the music-themed network Fuse.

She also hosted the heavy metal-themed program Uranium and a call-in and email advice program called Slave to the Metal. She formerly hosted Fuse Top 20 Countdown along with several online programs that she self-promotes.

Early life and career 
Chernetsky was born in Ukraine and raised in Brooklyn, New York. She attended Fort Hamilton High School and Hunter College. She was a big fan of MMUSA and a frequent poster on their bulletin boards.

She was chosen to make her broadcast debut on the show Tastemakers. Her brashness made her an instant favorite, and after a year on Tastemakers, she moved on to host Uranium in June 2002.

Uranium would offer one of the few televised outlets for heavy metal music and become one of MMUSA's (which changed its name to Fuse TV in 2003) most popular programs.

Chernetsky's popularity led to the debut of a spin-off entitled Metal Asylum which followed a similar format and lasted over 100 episodes. Around this same time, she began hosting the music-themed advice show Slave to the Metal.

These programs allowed Chernetsky to interview many of the biggest names in heavy metal as well as her personal idols. Within these few years, she established herself as a fixture of music journalism and the metal community, gaining exposure for new bands and exclusive access to events such as the Ozzfest 10th anniversary. Chernetsky would also sporadically join the multi-hosted team on IMX which ran from 2003 to 2004.

On April 14, 2010, she announced over Twitter the death of Type O Negative frontman Peter Steele on her Twitter account, saying "Peter Steele passed today. I loved my friend...our idol...my heart is with his band and family..."

She was also the host/MC of Rock on the Range 2010 in Columbus, Ohio, on May 22 and 23, introducing each band on the main stage. In July 2010, Juliya worked as tour correspondent for RockStar Mayhem Tour.

In 2011, Mistress Juliya hosted Welcome to Rockville in Jacksonville, Florida.

Fuse 
After over two years of being absent from Fuse, Juliya announced via Myspace her return to Fuse to do a weekly hard rock/metal countdown show. She also appeared on The Weekly Riff, a panel show hosted by Steven Smith. On September 22, 2008, she replaced Sami Jarroush as the host of No. 1 Countdown Rock.

Juliya is currently the co-host of Fuse Top 20 Countdown along with Allison Hagendorf. Fuse Top 20 Countdown is a countdown show of the 20 most popular rock, pop, hip-hop and R&B videos of the week that also features interviews with the artists behind the hits and the most popular celebrities of today.

Filmography

References

External links 
 Official Website
 
 Juliya Chernetsky at Myspace
 Juliya Chernetsky at Twitter
 Official Juliya Chernetsky at Facebook
 Top 20 Countdown at fuse.tv

1982 births
Living people
People from Brooklyn
Soviet emigrants to the United States
American television talk show hosts
VJs (media personalities)
Much (TV channel) personalities
Fort Hamilton High School alumni
Hunter College alumni